Finian's Rainbow is an album by bandleader Stan Kenton recorded in 1968 for Capitol Records.

Reception
The Allmusic review by Lindsay Planer says "Stan Kenton (piano/arranger) lends his highly stylistic touch to an assortment of Broadway and silver screen selections on the appropriately-titled Finian's Rainbow (1968). His proficiency as a jazz arranger and consummate musician provide unique interpretations on ten familiar melodies -- five taken from the score of Finian's Rainbow [Original Broadway Cast] (1947), and five from films".

Track listing
All compositions by Burton Lane and Yip Harburg except where noted.
 "Old Devil Moon" - 2:46
 "If This Isn't Love" - 2:25
 "When I'm Not Near The Girl I Love" - 2:21
 "How Are Things in Glocca Morra?" - 2:28
 "That Great Come-and-Get-It Day" - 3:00
 "Lullaby from Rosemary's Baby" (Krzysztof Komeda) - 3:01
 "People" (Jule Styne, Bob Merrill) - 2:07
 "Villa Rides" (Maurice Jarre, Eddie Snyder, Larry Kusik) - 3:07
 "Chastity Belt" (Riz Ortolani) - 2:56
 "The Odd Couple" (Neal Hefti, Sammy Kahn) - 2:35  
Recorded at Capitol Studios in Hollywood, CA on July 16, 1968 (tracks 5 & 10), July 17, 1968 (tracks 1, 2 & 9) and July 18, 1968 (tracks 3, 4 & 6-8).

Personnel
Stan Kenton - piano, conductor
Jay Daversa, Darryl Eaton, Jim Kartchner, John Madrid, Mike Price - trumpet  	
Shelly Denny, Dick Shearer, Tom Whittaker - trombone
Joe Randazzo - bass trombone
Bob Goodwin - bass trombone, tuba
Ray Reed - alto saxophone, flute
Mike Altschul, Bob Crosby  - tenor saxophone, clarinet
Earle Dumler - baritone saxophone, English horn
John Mitchell - baritone saxophone (tracks 6 & 8)
Bill Fritz - bass saxophone, baritone saxophone (tracks 1-7, 9 & 10) 
Emil Richards - vibraphone, marimba (track 8) 
Al Vescovo - guitar
John Smith - bass  
Dee Barton - drums, arranger
Efraim Logreira - percussion

References

Stan Kenton albums
1968 albums
Capitol Records albums

Albums recorded at Capitol Studios
Albums produced by Lee Gillette